Northvale is a borough in Bergen County, in the U.S. state of New Jersey. As of the 2020 United States census, the borough's population was 4,761, an increase of 121 (+2.6%) from the 2010 census count of 4,640, which in turn reflected an increase of 180 (+4.0%) from the 4,460 counted in the 2000 census.

History 
The borough of Northvale was formed on March 15, 1916, from the remaining portions of Harrington Township, based on the results of a referendum held on April 4, 1916. With the creation of Northvale, Harrington Township was dissolved. Portions of Northvale were transferred to create the borough of Rockleigh, as of March 13, 1923. The borough's name derives from its location and topography.

Geography
According to the United States Census Bureau, the borough had a total area of 1.27 square miles (3.28 km2), including 1.27 square miles (3.28 km2) of land and <0.01 square miles (0.01 km2) of water (0.24%).

The borough borders Norwood, Old Tappan and Rockleigh in Bergen County; and Tappan (in the Town of Orangetown) in Rockland County, New York.

Demographics

2010 census

The Census Bureau's 2006–2010 American Community Survey showed that (in 2010 inflation-adjusted dollars) median household income was $86,607 (with a margin of error of +/− $13,519) and the median family income was $89,125 (+/− $16,380). Males had a median income of $66,563 (+/− $14,582) versus $31,228 (+/− $7,496) for females. The per capita income for the borough was $35,404 (+/− $4,301). About 3.7% of families and 4.1% of the population were below the poverty line, including 1.7% of those under age 18 and 5.9% of those age 65 or over.

Same-sex couples headed 9 households in 2010, an increase of 50% from the 6 counted in 2000.

2000 census
As of the 2000 United States census there were 4,460 people, 1,575 households, and 1,236 families residing in the borough. The population density was 3,381.2 people per square mile (1,304.6/km2). There were 1,596 housing units at an average density of 1,210.0 per square mile (466.8/km2). The racial makeup of the borough was 82.91% White, 0.76% African American, 0.07% Native American, 14.06% Asian, 1.17% from other races, and 1.03% from two or more races. Hispanic or Latino of any race were 4.73% of the population.

There were 1,575 households, out of which 33.6% had children under the age of 18 living with them, 66.2% were married couples living together, 8.1% had a female householder with no husband present, and 21.5% were non-families. 18.5% of all households were made up of individuals, and 10.3% had someone living alone who was 65 years of age or older. The average household size was 2.83 and the average family size was 3.21.

In the borough the population was spread out, with 22.5% under the age of 18, 6.4% from 18 to 24, 29.3% from 25 to 44, 25.9% from 45 to 64, and 16.0% who were 65 years of age or older. The median age was 40 years. For every 100 females, there were 99.3 males. For every 100 females age 18 and over, there were 94.2 males.

The median income for a household in the borough was $72,500, and the median income for a family was $81,153. Males had a median income of $50,901 versus $37,563 for females. The per capita income for the borough was $28,206. About 2.4% of families and 3.9% of the population were below the poverty line, including 6.9% of those under age 18 and 1.4% of those age 65 or over.

Government

Local government
Northvale is governed under the Borough form of New Jersey municipal government, which is used in 218 municipalities (of the 564) statewide, making it the most common form of government in New Jersey. The governing body is comprised of a Mayor and a Borough Council, with all positions elected at-large on a partisan basis as part of the November general election. A Mayor is elected directly by the voters to a four-year term of office. The Borough Council is comprised of six members elected to serve three-year terms on a staggered basis, with two seats coming up for election each year in a three-year cycle. The Borough form of government used by Northvale is a "weak mayor / strong council" government in which council members act as the legislative body with the mayor presiding at meetings and voting only in the event of a tie. The mayor can veto ordinances subject to an override by a two-thirds majority vote of the council. The mayor makes committee and liaison assignments for council members, and most appointments are made by the mayor with the advice and consent of the council.
    
, the Mayor of Northvale is Republican Joseph E. McGuire, whose term of office ends December 31, 2026. Members of the Borough Council are Thomas R. Argiro (D, 2023), John M. Hogan (D, 2023), Martin Mattessich (R, 2025), Kara McMorrow (R, 2024), Domenich Menafra (R, 2025), Roy Sokoloski (R, 2024; appointed to serve an unexpired term).

In February 2023, Roy Sokoloski was appointed to fill the seat expiring in December 2024 that had been held by Joseph McGuire until he resigned from office.

In December 2015, the borough council selected Michael Small from a list of three candidates nominated by the Democratic municipal committee to fill the seat vacated by Gloria Libby, who had left office earlier that month to follow her employer, Mercedes-Benz USA, which had relocated its headquarters from Bergen County to Atlanta.

In March 2014, Mayor Paul Bazela resigned from office after being convicted of theft in his role as operations manager for the Passaic Valley Sewerage Commission, after a jury found that he had used PVSC employees to repair the homes of individuals connected to him. Then-Borough Council President Ed Piehler was chosen to succeed him as acting mayor.

Federal, state and county representation
Northvale is located in the 5th Congressional District and is part of New Jersey's 37th state legislative district. Prior to the 2011 reapportionment following the 2010 Census, Northvale had been in the 39th state legislative district.

Politics
As of March 2011, there were a total of 2,699 registered voters in Northvale, of which 701 (26.0% vs. 31.7% countywide) were registered as Democrats, 560 (20.7% vs. 21.1%) were registered as Republicans and 1,437 (53.2% vs. 47.1%) were registered as Unaffiliated. There was one voter registered to another party. Among the borough's 2010 Census population, 58.2% (vs. 57.1% in Bergen County) were registered to vote, including 77.7% of those ages 18 and over (vs. 73.7% countywide).

In the 2016 presidential election, Republican Donald Trump received 1,155 votes (51.3% vs. 41.6% countywide), ahead of Democrat Hillary Clinton with 994 votes (44.2% vs. 54.8%) and other candidates with 66 votes (2.9% vs. 3.0%), among the 2,250 ballots cast by the borough's 3,060 registered voters, for a turnout of 73.5% (vs. 72.5% in Bergen County). In the 2012 presidential election, Republican Mitt Romney received 1,100 votes (53.3% vs. 43.5% countywide), ahead of Democrat Barack Obama with 924 votes (44.8% vs. 54.8%) and other candidates with 21 votes (1.0% vs. 0.9%), among the 2,064 ballots cast by the borough's 2,825 registered voters, for a turnout of 73.1% (vs. 70.4% in Bergen County). In the 2008 presidential election, Republican John McCain received 1,206 votes (54.9% vs. 44.5% countywide), ahead of Democrat Barack Obama with 949 votes (43.2% vs. 53.9%) and other candidates with 14 votes (0.6% vs. 0.8%), among the 2,198 ballots cast by the borough's 2,798 registered voters, for a turnout of 78.6% (vs. 76.8% in Bergen County). In the 2004 presidential election, Republican George W. Bush received 1,188 votes (55.9% vs. 47.2% countywide), ahead of Democrat John Kerry with 912 votes (42.9% vs. 51.7%) and other candidates with 14 votes (0.7% vs. 0.7%), among the 2,125 ballots cast by the borough's 2,743 registered voters, for a turnout of 77.5% (vs. 76.9% in the whole county).

In the 2013 gubernatorial election, Republican Chris Christie received 65.8% of the vote (876 cast), ahead of Democrat Barbara Buono with 32.6% (434 votes), and other candidates with 1.7% (22 votes), among the 1,371 ballots cast by the borough's 2,739 registered voters (39 ballots were spoiled), for a turnout of 50.1%. In the 2009 gubernatorial election, Republican Chris Christie received 842 votes (54.1% vs. 45.8% countywide), ahead of Democrat Jon Corzine with 606 votes (38.9% vs. 48.0%), Independent Chris Daggett with 73 votes (4.7% vs. 4.7%) and other candidates with 5 votes (0.3% vs. 0.5%), among the 1,557 ballots cast by the borough's 2,722 registered voters, yielding a 57.2% turnout (vs. 50.0% in the county).

Education
The Northvale Public Schools serve students in kindergarten through eighth grade at Northvale Public School. Students from Rockleigh, a non-operating school district, attend the district as part of a sending/receiving relationship. As of the 2020–21 school year, the district, comprised of one school, had an enrollment of 545 students and 48.5 classroom teachers (on an FTE basis), for a student–teacher ratio of 11.2:1. In the 2012–13 school year, Thomas Jefferson School (for grades K–4) and Nathan Hale School (for grades 5–8) were combined to create the Northvale Public School, as part of an effort to reduce costs associated with running two separate schools that shared a common campus and corridor.

Students in public school for ninth through twelfth grades attend Northern Valley Regional High School at Old Tappan, together with students from Harrington Park, Norwood and Old Tappan, along with students from Rockleigh who attend the high school as part of a sending/receiving relationship. As of the 2020–21 school year, the high school had an enrollment of 1,103 students and 94.6 classroom teachers (on an FTE basis), for a student–teacher ratio of 11.7:1. The school is one of the two schools of the Northern Valley Regional High School District, which also serves students from the neighboring communities of Closter, Demarest and Haworth at the Northern Valley Regional High School at Demarest. During the 1994–1996 school years, Northern Valley Regional High School at Old Tappan was awarded the Blue Ribbon School Award of Excellence by the United States Department of Education.

Public school students from the borough, and all of Bergen County, are eligible to attend the secondary education programs offered by the Bergen County Technical Schools, which include the Bergen County Academies in Hackensack, and the Bergen Tech campus in Teterboro or Paramus. The district offers programs on a shared-time or full-time basis, with admission based on a selective application process and tuition covered by the student's home school district.

Economy
 Northvale Square Shopping Center, located on Livingston Street, includes tenants such as Applebee's, CVS Pharmacy, GameStop, Moe's Southwest Grill, Panera Bread, and Sleepy's.

Transportation

Roads and highways

County Route 505 passes through Northvale.

Public transportation
Rockland Coaches provides service on routes 20/20T to the Port Authority Bus Terminal in Midtown Manhattan.

Saddle River Tours / Ameribus offers service on the 20 / 84 route to the George Washington Bridge Bus Station.

In popular culture
The television show Ed, which ran from 2000 to 2004, was filmed in Northvale. The interior and exterior shots for "Stuckeybowl" were filmed at the now closed and demolished bowling alley, formerly known as "Country Club Lanes". Housing for seniors ages 55+ now exists on the site.

In the 2008 USA Network series In Plain Sight, during the episode, Stan by Me, two FBI agents are murdered and a federally protected witness is kidnapped in Northvale.

Notable people

People who were born in, residents of, or otherwise closely associated with Northvale include:

 John Calabro (1914–1994), artist and sculptor who has created coins, medals, plaques, busts, statutes and heroic-size works of famous events and notable figures from the world of politics, sports and entertainment
 L. D. Clawson (1885–1937), movie pioneer who founded the American Society of Cinematographers
 Bob Porter (1940–2021), record producer, discographer, writer, and radio presenter
 John E. Rooney (born 1939), politician who served in the New Jersey General Assembly, where he represented the 39th Legislative District, and as Mayor of Northvale
 Terese Terranova (born 1947), retired para table tennis player who won two gold medals at the 1988 Summer Paralympics
 Richard G. Zweifel (1926–2019), herpetologist, who has specialized in studying frogs

Historic sites
Haring-Blauvelt House was built in 1810 and was added to the National Register of Historic Places on January 10, 1983.

References

Related reading

 Municipal Incorporations of the State of New Jersey (according to Counties) prepared by the Division of Local Government, Department of the Treasury (New Jersey); December 1, 1958.
 Clayton, W. Woodford; and Nelson, William. History of Bergen and Passaic Counties, New Jersey, with Biographical Sketches of Many of its Pioneers and Prominent Men., Philadelphia: Everts and Peck, 1882.
 Harvey, Cornelius Burnham (ed.), Genealogical History of Hudson and Bergen Counties, New Jersey. New York: New Jersey Genealogical Publishing Co., 1900.
 Van Valen, James M. History of Bergen County, New Jersey. New York: New Jersey Publishing and Engraving Co., 1900.
 Westervelt, Frances A. (Frances Augusta), 1858–1942, History of Bergen County, New Jersey, 1630–1923, Lewis Historical Publishing Company, 1923.

External links

 Northvale official website
 Northvale Public Schools
 
 School Data for the Northvale Public Schools, National Center for Education Statistics
 Northern Valley Regional High School District
 Northvale Public Library

 
1916 establishments in New Jersey
Borough form of New Jersey government
Boroughs in Bergen County, New Jersey
Populated places established in 1916